Anna Balsamo is an Italian poet born in Pisa, Italy, living and working in Florence, Italy.

She began writing for the theater as a teenager, and was next drawn to narrative writing and her stories were recognized in several competitions. A member of Florentine literary salons, she became the editor, then editor-in-chief, of the Italian magazine Firme Nostre (Our Signatures). Her novellas as well as literary and art reviews were published in the magazine, founded and at the time headed by Antonio De Lorenzo.

In 1998, Balsamo became a council member of the new Consiglio della Camerata dei Poeti, the Chamber of Poets in tradition of the Florentine Camerata. Under the presidency of Florentine poet Marcello Fabbri, Balsamo coordinated events in honor of Florentine poet Mario Luzi. The late poet attended full turnout salons that introduced some of his poetry from boyhood years from The Boat (La Barca), as well as key passages from the tragedy Ipazia.

Balsamo created costume design and music for the theatrical poetry presentation of Luzi's Ipazia.

The Chamber coordinates literary events with noted Italian poets such as Giuseppe Brunelli and Duccia Camiciotti.

In 2003, Anna Balsamo was appointed Vice-President to the Florentine association Poets Chamber founded in 1930 by Domenico François on suggestion of Giovanni Papini.

Her books have been featured at Turin, Rome, Frankfurt and Paris book fairs, as well as New York and Mexico. The title Taj Mahal Passion won four Ibiskos literary awards in 2008  and volumes of her poetry have won multiple Italian literary prizes.
In the 2011 she is one of the speakers in the poetic event "Da Firenze alle stelle" organized by La Pergola Arte 2° edition with Vanna Bonta, Giancarlo Bianchi and Enrico Nistri in the Basilica of San Marco in the Salone Annigoni.

Published works

Awards and honors
 2008 Isbiskos Books Fairs

Bibliography

References

External links
 Contemporary Italian Women Poets, introduces the work of Margherita Guidacci to English-reading audiences presenting her work in the context of the diversity of women's poetry in Italy during the decades since World War II.

Italian poets
Living people
People from Pisa
Year of birth missing (living people)